Ek Safar Aisa Kabhi Socha Na Tha is a Hindi-language television series on Sony Entertainment Television. It premiered on 9 February 2009. The series was produced by Rashmi Sharma of Rashmi Sharma Telefilms Limited, and the story is written by Virendra Shahaney.

Cast
Jayshree Soni as Ganga
Maninder Singh as Manav Rathore
Pankaj Dheer as Mr. Rathore (Manav's father)
Tapasvi Mehta as Golu (Ganga's Brother)
Madhavi Gogate as Mrs. Rathore (Manav's mother)
Kuldeep Malik as Vikram Rathore (Manav's chacha/uncle)
 Neelu Kohli as Rohini Rathore (Manav's chachi/aunt)
Rinku Ghosh as Maya Rathore (Manav's elder sister)
Guddi Maruti as Nanhi Bua (Ganga's aunt)

References

External links

 

Sony Entertainment Television original programming
Indian television series
Indian television soap operas
2009 Indian television series debuts
2009 Indian television series endings